MDP Youth Wing, is the youth movement of the Maldivian Democratic Party in Maldives. The organization is made up of all members of the Maldivian Democratic Party who are 18 to 35 years old.

A Humble Start

On June 26, 2005, the Maldivian Democratic Party (MDP) became the first political party to be registered in the Republic of Maldives.  Beginning with just 40 members, the MDP is now the largest political party in the Maldives, with over 40,000 registered members. The MDP prides itself in promoting policies that best reflect the priorities of Maldivians. Aside from the values of human rights and democratic practice, which are ingrained in all of the Party's activities, the MDP's policies encapsulate the Maldivian people's want of a state and society that provides both security and the opportunities for innovation and success.

Youth For Change
The MDP always strives to be in touch with the pulse of the population and with over 35% of Maldivian society being made up of individuals between the ages of 18–35, the MDP acknowledges the essential role of youth involvement in all sectors of politics and development. For instance, the MDP recognised that the pre 2008 constitution's voting age of 21 disenfranchised large sections of the country from major national decision-making processes, and thereby campaigned the Special Majlis, with success, to lower the voting age to 18. The national democratic reform process demonstrated the influence and the extent to which the youth of the country were invested in the future of a democratic Maldives, when youth from across the nation joined in activities such as ‘Badhalakah Emmen’, ‘Youth for Change’, and ‘Wathan Edhey’, combining young people's opinions, energy, and creativity in a powerful effort to bring change.

The establishment of the MDP's youth wing in 2010 sought to institutionalise youth involvement across the Party. This was initiated with the election of the Youth Wing's president, Aminath.  The youth wing has since taken a leading role in policy formulation, campaigning, street activism and fundraising, using the power of art, music, and social media to make sure that the MDP continues to be a voice for the youth of the Maldives.

Youth wings of political parties
Organizations established in 2010
Politics of the Maldives
Political organisations based in the Maldives
2010 establishments in the Maldives